Adrian Davis may refer to:

 Adrian Davis (Canadian football) (born 1981), Canadian football defensive tackle
 Adrian Davis (rugby league) (born 1990), Australian rugby league player
 Adrian Davis (governor), British economist and civil servant, governor of Montserrat